Nomis albopedalis is a moth in the family Crambidae. It was described by Victor Motschulsky in 1861. It is found on the Kuriles and Japan.

References

Moths described in 1861
Pyraustinae